Jakob Stegelmann (born 1957) is a Danish television presenter and producer, best known for hosting the TV show Troldspejlet, and creating the Danish version of the Disney Afternoon.

He also presented the television series Planet X which focuses on B-movies, and voiced Stan Lee in the Danish dub of Spider-Man: Into the Spider-Verse.

Filmography
 Så er der tegnefilm (1980–1989, 2019) - Creator
 Valhalla (1986) - Leading Animator
 Troldspejlet (1989–) - Host and Creator
 Disney Sjov (1990–) - Creator
 Planet X (2005–2006) - Host
 Toy Story 3 (2010) - Jack in a box (Danish dub)
 The Old Cinema (2011) - Host
 Wreck-It Ralph (2012) - Mr Litwak (Danish dub)
 Spider-Man: Into the Spider-Verse (2018) - Stan Lee (Danish dub)

Accolades
In 2006 Stegelmann became the first recipient of the new Nordic Game Prize. The prize was then named after him, to honor him.

References

External links
 

Danish television presenters
Living people
Danish male actors
1957 births